Paul Bost (May 16, 1905 Lincolnton, North Carolina – September 4, 1974 Lincolnton, North Carolina) was an American racecar driver.

Indy 500 results

References

1905 births
1974 deaths
Indianapolis 500 drivers
People from Lincolnton, North Carolina
Racing drivers from North Carolina
AAA Championship Car drivers